Cabaraya is a stratovolcano in Bolivia. It lies between the volcanoes Isluga and Tata Sabaya, immediately east of the border with Chile.

See also
 List of Ultras of South America

References

Sources

Stratovolcanoes of Bolivia
Subduction volcanoes
Volcanoes of Oruro Department
Five-thousanders of the Andes